Dipoena dorsata is a species of cobweb spider in the family Theridiidae. It is found in a range from the United States to Paraguay.

References

Theridiidae
Articles created by Qbugbot
Spiders described in 1944